Philidris myrmecodiae is a species of ant in the genus Philidris. Described by Emery in 1887, the species is endemic to Asia.

References

Dolichoderinae
Insects described in 1887
Hymenoptera of Asia